The Last Shall Be First may refer to:

 The Last Shall Be First (Sunz of Man album), 1998
 The Last Shall Be First (Dwellas album), 2000
 "The Last Shall Be First", an episode of Generation (TV series)

See also
Parable of the Workers in the Vineyard, from the Gospel of Matthew, the origin of the phrase